Takapsestis fascinata is a moth in the family Drepanidae. It was described by Yoshimoto in 1990. It is found in northern Vietnam and Yunnan, China.

References

Moths described in 1990
Thyatirinae
Moths of Asia